Paola Pozzoni (born 17 August 1965) is an Italian cross-country skier. Pozzoni was born in Lecco. She competed in the 1984 Winter Olympics in Sarajevo.

Cross-country skiing results
All results are sourced from the International Ski Federation (FIS).

Olympic Games

World Championships

World Cup

Season standings

References

External links
 Paola Pozzoni's profile at Sports Reference.com
 

1965 births
Living people
Italian female cross-country skiers
Olympic cross-country skiers of Italy
Cross-country skiers at the 1984 Winter Olympics
Sportspeople from Lecco